Peggy Jones may refer to:

Real people
Peggy Ann Jones (born 1939), English opera singer and actress
Peggy Jones (musician) (1940–2015), American musician known as Lady Bo
Peggy Lipton Jones (born 1946), American actress and former model

Fictional characters
Peggy Jones, fictional character in House at the End of the Street
Peggy Jones, fictional character in I'd Rather Be Right

See also
Margaret Jones (disambiguation)